Roaring Creek Township may refer to the following townships in the United States:

 Roaring Creek Township, Avery County, North Carolina
 Roaring Creek Township, Columbia County, Pennsylvania